Sittin' In  is the first album by singer-songwriters Loggins and Messina, released in 1971.

It began as a solo album by Kenny Loggins; Jim Messina was with Columbia Records, serving as an independent producer when he met Loggins. In the course of producing Loggins' work, Messina composed several songs and provided backing vocals and guitar, leading to the album's full title, Kenny Loggins with Jim Messina Sittin' In.

MFSL released an audiophile version of Sittin' In on the label's silver compact disc series in 1989. In 1994, Columbia Records' Sony Mastersound division also did their own remastering and released it as a gold CD. A new remastering by Kevin Gray was released as a vinyl-only pressing on 180-gram audiophile vinyl by Friday Music on May 10, 2011. In 2015, it was released by the Audio Fidelity label on a hybrid SACD that was mastered by Kevin Gray.

Track listing

Personnel
Loggins & Messina
 Kenny Loggins – vocals, rhythm guitar, acoustic guitar, harmonica
 Jim Messina – vocals, lead guitar, acoustic guitar
 Jon Clarke – oboe, steel drum, flute, tenor saxophone, baritone saxophone
 Lester "Al" Garth – violin, recorder, tenor saxophone, viola, alto saxophone, steel drum, backing vocals
 Larry Sims – bass guitar, backing vocals
 Merel Bregante – drums, backing vocals

Additional musicians
 Michael Omartian – concertina, keyboards, steel drum
 Milt Holland – percussion

Production
 Jim Messina – producer
 John Fiore – engineer
 Alex Kazanegras – mastering and mixing
 David Linderman – cover artwork
 Irvin Goodnoff and David Linderman – photography

Charts
Album – Billboard (United States)

Singles – Billboard (United States)

References

Loggins and Messina albums
1971 debut albums
Albums produced by Jim Messina (musician)
Columbia Records albums